Ghulam Faroq Nijrabi was a candidate in the Afghan presidential election in 2004 and the Afghan presidential elections in 2009. 
Nijrabi is a Physician and a lecturer at Kabul University's medical college.

In 2009 Nijrabi ranked 20th in a field of 38, with 2,240 votes.

References 

Afghan politicians
Afghan physicians
1954 births
Living people